The Best of Joe Cocker is a compilation album by Joe Cocker, released as a 16-track release in UK, Germany and the rest of the Europe in 1992 and as a 12-track release in the United States and Canada in 1993.

Track listing (1992)
"Unchain My Heart" (90's Version) – 5:06 (Bobby Sharp, Teddy Powell) (1992)
"You Can Leave Your Hat On" – 4:14 (Randy Newman) (1986)
"When the Night Comes" – 3:56 (Bryan Adams, Jim Vallance, Diane Warren) (1989)
"Up Where We Belong (Duet with Jennifer Warnes)" – 3:55 (Jack Nitzsche, Buffy Sainte-Marie, Will Jennings) (1982)
"Now That the Magic Has Gone" – 3:56 (John Miles) (1992)
"Don't You Love Me Anymore" – 4:09 (Albert Hammond, Diane Warren) (1986)
"I Can Hear the River" – 3:41 (Don Dixon) (1991)
"Sorry Seems to Be the Hardest Word" – 3:57 (Elton John, Bernie Taupin) (1991)
"Shelter Me" – 4:20 (Nick Di Stefano) (1985)
"Feels Like Forever" – 4:46 (Bryan Adams, Diane Warren) (1992)
"Night Calls" – 3:25 (Jeff Lynne) (1991)
"Don't Let the Sun Go Down on Me" – 5:28 (Elton John, Bernie Taupin) (1991)
"Now That You're Gone" – 4:15 (Klaus Lage, Diether Dehm, Tony Carey, Joe Cocker) (1986)
"Civilized Man" – 3:56 (Richard Feldman, Pat Robinson) (1984)
"When a Woman Cries" – 4:20 (Joshua Kadison) (1992)
"With a Little Help from My Friends" (Live at Memorial Auditorium, Lowell, Mass., October 5, 1989.) – 9:27 (John Lennon, Paul McCartney) (Previously released on Joe Cocker Live, 1990)

Track listing (1993)
"Unchain My Heart" (90's Version) – 5:06 (Bobby Sharp, Teddy Powell) (1992)
"You Can Leave Your Hat On" – 4:14 (Randy Newman) (1986)
"When the Night Comes" – 3:56 (Bryan Adams, Jim Vallance, Diane Warren) (1989)
"Up Where We Belong (Duet with Jennifer Warnes)" – 3:55 (Jack Nitzsche, Buffy Sainte-Marie, Will Jennings) (1982)
"Now That the Magic Has Gone" – 3:56 (John Miles) (1992)
"Don't You Love Me Anymore" – 4:09 (Albert Hammond, Diane Warren) (1986)
"Shelter Me" – 4:20 (Nick Di Stefano) (1985)
"Feels Like Forever" – 4:46 (Bryan Adams, Diane Warren) (1992)
"Night Calls" – 3:25 (Jeff Lynne) (1991)
"Sorry Seems to Be the Hardest Word" – 3:57 (Elton John, Bernie Taupin) (1991)
"Civilized Man" – 3:56 (Richard Feldman, Pat Robinson) (1984)
"With a Little Help from My Friends" (Live at Memorial Auditorium, Lowell, Mass., October 5, 1989.) – 9:27 (John Lennon, Paul McCartney) (Previously released on Joe Cocker Live, 1990)

Personnel
Joe Cocker – lead vocals
Jennifer Warnes – lead vocals (track 4)
Stewart Levine – producer
Abraham Laboriel – bass (track 4)
Leon "Ndugu" Chancler – drums (track 4)
Louis Shelton – guitar (track 4)
Bobby Lyle – keyboards (track 4)
Robbie Buchanan – keyboards (track 4)
Paulinho da Costa – percussion (track 4)

Charts

Certifications

References

1992 greatest hits albums
Joe Cocker compilation albums
Capitol Records compilation albums